Vasylkivka is an urban-type settlement in Synelnykove Raion, Dnipropetrovsk Oblast in Ukraine. It hosts the administration of Vasylkivka settlement hromada, one of the hromadas of Ukraine. Population: 

Vasylkivka is located on the banks of the Vovcha River, a left tributary of the Samara, itself a left tributary of the Dnieper.

Until 18 July 2020, Vasylkivka was the administrative center of Vasylkivka Raion. The raion was abolished in July 2020 as part of the administrative reform of Ukraine, which reduced the number of raions of Dnipropetrovsk Oblast to seven. The area of Vasylkivka Raion was merged into Synelnykove Raion.

Economy

Transportation
Vasylkivka is connected by road with Pavlohrad, where it has access to the Highway M04 connecting Dnipro with Pokrovsk, and with Pokrovske, where the Highway H15 continues to Zaporizhia.

Ulianovka railway station is located in Vasylkivka, on the railway line connecting Dnipro with Pokrovske, and with further connections to Pokrovsk, Zaporizhia, and Berdiansk.

References

Urban-type settlements in Synelnykove Raion